Events from the year 1865 in China.

Incumbents 
 Tongzhi Emperor (5th year)
 Regent: Empress Dowager Cixi
 Regent: Prince Gong

Events 

 Taiping Rebellion
 Battle of Fujian, Qing forces clear remnants of Taiping loyalists 
 Nian Rebellion
 Siege of Beijing (1865) 
 Miao Rebellion (1854–73)
 Dungan Revolt (1862–77)
 Panthay Rebellion
 Prince Gong steps down from regency but continues being head of the Grand Council
 Tongzhi Restoration

Births 

 Hü King Eng, second ethnic Chinese woman to attend university in the United States, became a famous physician

Deaths 
 Sengge Rinchen Qing commander killed by the forces of a minor rebel leader of the Nian Rebellion
 Li Shixian, Taiping commander, killed by his own troops after they surrender to the Qing